Ophiocordyceps coenomyia is an entomopathogenic fungus belonging to the order Hypocreales (Ascomycota) in the family Ophiocordycipitaceae. It is parasitic to awl-fly larvae. This species is characterized by a globose, alutaceous fertile part at the apex of its light yellow stroma, its immersed perithecia, and ascospores dividing in turn into partspores. The species is closely related to O. heteropoda.

References

Further reading
 Araújo, João, et al. "Unravelling the diversity behind Ophiocordyceps unilateralis complex: Three new species of Zombie-Ant fungus from Brazilian Amazon." bioRxiv (2014): 003806.

External links
 

Diptera pests and diseases
Animal fungal diseases
Fungi described in 2014
Ophiocordycipitaceae